Aleardo Terzi (1870–1943) was an Italian illustrator and artist.

Life
Terzi was born in Palermo. He died in Castelletto sopra Ticino in 1943.

As an illustrator, Terzi was described as bringing Art Nouveau poster design to a world-class level. 
He produced work throughout his life, notably for the Italian poster company Casa Ricordi. Most of his work was destroyed in the 1960s when the company cleared its warehouses.

He worked as an illustrator for a Rome daily called La Tribuna Illustrata.
He illustrated Italian versions of Little Lord Fauntleroy and Gulliver's Travels.

His brother, Amedeo John Engel Terzi (1872–1956), was also an artist (illustrator and entomologist specialising in Diptera).

References

External links
 

1870 births
1943 deaths
Italian illustrators
Art Nouveau illustrators
Artists from Palermo
Italian poster artists
Italian stamp designers